John Francary O'Reilly (born August 4, 1940) is a Canadian politician. He represented the Haliburton—Kawartha Lakes—Brock riding for the Liberal party from 1993 to 2004. He lost his job in the 2004 election to the Conservative candidate Barry Devolin. He is now a real estate broker by profession.

References

1940 births
Living people
Members of the House of Commons of Canada from Ontario
Liberal Party of Canada MPs
21st-century Canadian politicians